KIFG (1510 AM) is a commercial radio station serving the Iowa Falls, Iowa area.  The station primarily broadcasts a classic hits format.  KIFG is licensed to Times-Citizen Communications, Inc and has a daytime-only license.

History
On June 30, 2010, KIFG changed their format from adult contemporary to classic hits.

External links
KIFG website

IFG (AM)
Radio stations established in 1962
IFG
1962 establishments in Iowa